Jeremiah and Jeremias are surnames.

Those bearing the name include:

Alfred Jeremias (1864–1935), German historian
Andrea Jeremiah (born 1985), Indian singer and actress
Ciaran and Kevin Jeremiah, (born c. 1970), in the English band The Feeling
Danny Jeremiah, Completed Prudential Ride London 46 2016
David Jeremiah (born 1941), American pastor
David E. Jeremiah (1934–2013), American admiral
Eddie Jeremiah (1905–1967), Armenian-American hockey player
Ian Jeremiah (born 1970), Welsh cyclist
Joachim Jeremias (1900–1979), German theologian
Jonathan Jeremiah, British singer-songwriter

See also 
Geremia